Rim Jong-sim ( or  ; born 5 February 1993) is a North Korean weightlifter, two time Olympic Champion, World Champion, Asian Games gold and bronze medalist, and Asian Champion competing in the 69 kg and 75 kg category until 2018 and 76 kg starting in 2018 after the International Weightlifting Federation reorganized the categories.

Career
She won the gold medal at the 2012 Summer Olympics at the women's 69 kg event. Four years later, she won the gold medal at the women's 75 kg event at the 2016 Summer Olympics.

Personal life 
Has a younger sister Rim Un-sim who is an Olympic weightlifter in 64 kg division.

Major results

References

Further reading

External links
 
 
 

1993 births
Living people
North Korean female weightlifters
Olympic weightlifters of North Korea
Weightlifters at the 2012 Summer Olympics
Weightlifters at the 2016 Summer Olympics
Olympic gold medalists for North Korea
Olympic medalists in weightlifting
Weightlifters at the 2010 Asian Games
Medalists at the 2012 Summer Olympics
Medalists at the 2016 Summer Olympics
Weightlifters at the 2014 Asian Games
Weightlifters at the 2018 Asian Games
Asian Games medalists in weightlifting
World Weightlifting Championships medalists
Asian Games gold medalists for North Korea
Asian Games bronze medalists for North Korea
Medalists at the 2014 Asian Games
Medalists at the 2018 Asian Games
Universiade medalists in weightlifting
Sportspeople from Pyongyang
Universiade gold medalists for North Korea
21st-century North Korean women